Prallsville is an unincorporated community located along New Jersey Route 29 by the border of Stockton and Delaware Township in Hunterdon County, New Jersey. The Delaware River and Wickecheoke Creek border the community.  The Prallsville District was listed on the National Register of Historic Places in 1979.

History
The feeder canal for the Delaware and Raritan Canal, which runs along the Delaware River, was built through the community in the 1830s. Later, in the 1850s, the Belvidere-Delaware Railroad was built along the canal and a station built here.

Historic district

The Prallsville District is a  historic district encompassing the village. It was added to the National Register of Historic Places on June 27, 1979 for its significance in industry. It includes 15 contributing buildings and 2 contributing structures. The district is also known as Prallsville Mills after John Prall Jr. who bought them in 1794.

The area is part of the Delaware and Raritan Canal State Park and serves as open-air museum.

Gallery

References

External links
 
 

Stockton, New Jersey
Delaware Township, Hunterdon County, New Jersey
Unincorporated communities in Hunterdon County, New Jersey
Unincorporated communities in New Jersey
National Register of Historic Places in Hunterdon County, New Jersey
Historic districts on the National Register of Historic Places in New Jersey
New Jersey Register of Historic Places
Museums in Hunterdon County, New Jersey
Open-air museums in New Jersey